Tara Geraghty-Moats (born April 12, 1993) is an American ski jumper, Nordic combined and biathlete skier. In ski jumping she has competed at World Cup level since the 2014/15 season, with her best individual result being ninth place in Râșnov on February 8, 2015; her best team finish is seventh in Zaō on 20 January 2018.

In Nordic combined, she won the 2018/19 Continental Cup season with ten consecutive wins out of eleven competitions. In December 2020 she won the first ever Nordic combined women’s World Cup competition.

References

External links

Tara Geraghty-Moats profile at Women's Ski Jumping USA
Tara Geraghty-Moats interview at the FIS

1993 births
Living people
American female ski jumpers
People from Lebanon, New Hampshire
Sportspeople from New Hampshire
American female Nordic combined skiers
21st-century American women
American female biathletes